Achille Jacques-Jean-Marie Devéria (6 February 180023 December 1857) was a French painter and lithographer known for his portraits of famous writers and artists. His younger brother was the Romantic painter Eugène Devéria, and two of his six children were Théodule Devéria and Gabriel Devéria.

Early life
His father was a civil employee of the navy. Devéria became a student of Anne-Louis Girodet-Trioson and Louis Lafitte. In 1822, he began exhibiting at the Paris Salon. At some point, he opened an art school together with his brother Eugène, who was also a painter.

Artistic works
By 1830 Devéria had become a successful illustrator and had published many lithographs in the form of notebooks and albums (e.g., his illustrations to Goethe's Faust, 1828) and romantic novels. He also produced many engravings of libertine contents.

Style
Devéria's experience in the art of the vignette and Mezzotint influenced his numerous lithographs, most of which were issued by his father-in-law, Charles-Etienne Motte (1785–1836). Most of his work consisted of "pseudo-historical, pious, sentimental or erotic scenes". (Wright) Since he rarely depicted tragic or grave themes, he appears less Romantic than many other artists of the time.

His paintings were mainly done using watercolours. The French poet and critic Charles Baudelaire referred to his portrait series as showing "all the morals and aesthetics of the age".

Subjects
Devéria was also known for doing portraits of artists and writers, whom he entertained in his Paris studio on Rue de l'Ouest. The list of his sitters includes Alexandre Dumas, Prosper Mérimée, Sir Walter Scott, Jacques-Louis David, Alfred de Musset, Charles Augustin Sainte-Beuve, Honoré de Balzac, Théodore Géricault, Victor Hugo, Marie Dorval, Alphonse de Lamartine, Alfred de Vigny, Jane Stirling, and Franz Liszt.

Late life
In 1849 Devéria was appointed director of the Bibliothèque Nationale's department of engravings and assistant curator of the Louvre's Egyptian department. In the following years, he taught drawing and lithography to his son, Théodule Devéria, and both worked on a family portrait album from 1853 until his death. They applied ink wash to several of the portraits in the album, possibly in preparation for printing lithographs from the photographs. The album photographs by Théodule Devéria are dated 1854.

Devéria spent his last days traveling in Egypt, making drawings and transcribing texts. He died in 1857.

Legacy
Works by Devéria are in the Louvre Museum, the Fine Arts Museums of San Francisco, the J. Paul Getty Museum, the Norton Simon Museum, and the Université de Liège collections.

Gallery

References

 
 
 Stephen Bann, 'Achille Deveria and French Illustration in the Romantic Period', Print Quarterly, vol. XXIX, no. 3, September 2012, pp. 288–299.
Works by Achille Devéria at the National Gallery of Art

External links
 
Works by Achille Devéria at the National Gallery of Art

1800 births
1857 deaths
19th-century French painters
French male painters
French printmakers
French lithographers
French erotic artists
Painters from Paris
Sibling artists
19th-century French male artists